Kurichchi Marimuthu Balasubramaniam better known as Ku. Ma. Balasubramaniam (1920-1994) was an Indian writer and poet who wrote mainly in the Tamil language.

Early life
Ku. Ma. Balasubramaniam born on 13 May 1920 at Velukkudi near Mannargudi in Tiruvarur district. His parents are Marimuthu and Govindammal. His father died when he was still a child. Therefore, he could not continue his school studies after 6th standard. However, his mother, who was a literate woman, taught him religious hymns in Tamil. He started writing short stories and poems from the age of 16. His writings were published in popular Tamil magazines and periodicals.

Observing his interest in poetry, the Headmaster of Chennai Chintadripet High School, Thiruvengadam taught him grammar.

Writer
He wrote the screenplay, dialogues and lyrics for Konjum Salangai in 1962 and for Mahakavi Kalidas in 1966. He also wrote dialogues and lyrics for Ponni (1953) and Madadhipathi Magal (1962). He worked as assistant director and wrote lyrics for Or Iravu (1951) and Gomathiyin Kaadhalan (1955). He wrote story and lyrics for Velaikaran (1952)

Tamil Film Lyricist
He penned his first lyrics for Or Iravu. The song Puvi Mael Maanamudan Uyir Vaazha Vazhiyedhum Illaiye was tuned by R. Sudarsanam.

Public Service
He was a member of the Tamil Nadu Legislative Council. He also functioned as the Secretary of the Tamil Nadu State Literary and Music and Drama Society.

Awards and Felicitations
 Kalaimamani award by Tamil Nadu State Government on 25.01.1975.
 Kavikuyil award by Erode Tamil Poets Society on 13.05.1975.

Notable compositions

Bibliography

References

External links
 Lyrics by Ku Ma Paa

1920 births
1994 deaths
Tamil poets
Tamil writers
Tamil film poets
Indian lyricists
People from Tiruvarur district